Sir Māui Wiremu Pita Naera Pōmare  (1875 or 1876 – 27 June 1930) was a New Zealand medical doctor and politician, being counted among the more prominent Māori political figures. He is particularly known for his efforts to improve Māori health and living conditions. However, Pōmare's career was not without controversy: he negotiated the effective removal of the last of Taranaki Maori land from its native inhabitants – some 18,000 acres – in a move which has been described as the "final disaster" for his people. He was a member of the Ngati Mutunga iwi originally from North Taranaki; he later lived in Wellington and the Chatham Islands after the 1835 invasion.

Early life
The date of Pōmare's birth is unclear—school records give 24 August 1875 but other sources give 13 January 1876. He was born at a pa near Urenui in Taranaki. His father, Wiremu Naera Pōmare, was of Ngāti Mutunga descent and his mother, Mere Hautonga Nicoll, was of Ngāti Toa descent. His maternal grandmother, Kahe Te Rau-o-te-rangi, had been a signatory of the Treaty of Waitangi. Both of his parents died before he reached adulthood, leaving him in the guardianship of his aunt. Pōmare was the boy injured at Parihaka when a horse trod on his foot.

Education

Pōmare attended Christchurch Boys' High School and then Te Aute College.  Although his family wanted him to study law Pōmare decided to become a doctor and, in 1895, he began study at a Seventh-day Adventist Church medical college at Battle Creek in the US state of Michigan. He remained in the United States until 1900 and travelled extensively.

Department of Health
At the time of Pōmare's return to New Zealand there was considerable concern about public health, with the quality of housing and sanitation being a major political issue. The problem was particularly pressing in Māori communities and Pōmare, as one of a small number of trained Māori doctors, was selected to serve as Māori Health Officer in the Department of Health. In this role he undertook a number of major campaigns to improve Māori health and met with considerable success. Pōmare was highly active in the everyday work of his office, often walking to remote villages to give public speeches. His frequent lectures on health matters gave him considerable skill in oratory.

In contrast to some of his friends, notably Āpirana Ngata, Pōmare was not particularly concerned about the loss of Māori cultural identity, and sponsored the Tohunga Suppression Act of 1907 which led to loss of many oral traditions. While Pōmare and Ngata agreed on the need to modernise Māori living conditions, Pōmare did not share Ngata's drive to preserve and protect traditional Māori culture and arts—instead Pōmare believed that, eventually, Pākehā and Māori would merge to form a single culture incorporating the best aspects of both (a common ideal of his iwi).

Member of Parliament

In the 1911 election, Pōmare stood for the House of Representatives as an Independent in the Western Maori electorate that covered the western part of the North Island from Wellington to just south of Auckland, plus the east coast from Tauranga north. Aided by support from the "Māori King", Mahuta Tāwhiao, he was successful, displacing the incumbent Henare Kaihau. He was aligned with the new Reform Party that had won the largest number of seats. When the party formed a government, Pōmare was appointed in July 1912 to Cabinet as a minister without portfolio, a largely symbolic position. Pōmare was quite popular with his party—in part this is likely because he did not promote an independent Māori cultural identity and that fitted well with the Reform Party's generally conservative views. (Meanwhile, Pōmare's old friend, Āpirana Ngata, was serving as an MP for the opposition Liberal Party.)

Taranaki land negotiation
In 1881 the crown had set aside 187,000 acres for Taranaki Maori "absolutely and for all time", by 1911 only 18,000 acres remained and it was being leased to settlers on the behalf of Maori, although in an act of defiance of land confiscation, local Maori never claimed the rent. Both Waikato and Taranaki elected Māui Pōmare as the member for Western Maori to ensure this 18,000 acres would not become freehold settler property in perpetuity. In 1913 Pōmare attempted to appease both his people and pakeha settlers by extending the lease settlers currently had for a further 10 years after which it would revert to Maori ownership – provided they pay compensation to settlers for appreciation in value. In 1923 Maori reclaimed their 18,000 acres but Pōmare had converted the land from leasehold to freehold, something his people were woefully unprepared to deal with. Overwhelmed by a system they didn't understand the Maori sold back to the Pakeha settlers who now had this last 18,000 acres in perpetuity. Late in the first World War Pōmare went to Waahi Pa to fill a conscription quota for Taranaki Maori, on arrival he was greeted in this manner: "He was met at the station by a hostile crowd and escorted to the riverside, where he was a spectator of an event never before recorded in European times. When the old-time Maoris wished to demonstrate their most extreme measure of contempt for any person they danced a haka standing naked and waist-high in a river and at appropriate times in the dance turned their posteriors towards the unwelcome visitor. There were no greater depths of ignominy in the Maori repertoire of insults – it was the absolute in loathing and contumely. Such was the spectacle confronting the Member for Western Maori..."

World War I
During World War I Pōmare and Ngata joined forces to encourage Māori to join the armed forces. Pōmare and Ngata both believed that by participating strongly in the war and fighting to defend the country, Māori would demonstrate to Pākehā that they were full citizens. Pōmare angered many of his constituents, however, by extending conscription to Maori under the Military Service Act.

Ministerial career
In April 1916, Pōmare was given ministerial responsibility for the Cook Islands, then a New Zealand territory. He lobbied strongly for more funding to be given to the islands and was responsible for considerable infrastructural improvement. He opposed, however, the idea of self-governance for the islands, saying that they were not yet ready for it. On a number of occasions he overrode laws passed by the islands' own council, causing a certain amount of complaint. On the whole, however, he was well regarded in the Cook Islands, being presented with a silver cup at the end of his service.

Later, in May 1925, Pōmare was appointed Minister of Health, his highest office. Due to economic problems the Health Department's budget was low, making it difficult for Pōmare to effect any important reforms. Nevertheless, he managed to make gains in some areas, particularly maternity care and equipment sterilisation.

Pōmare was appointed Companion of the Order of St Michael and St George (CMG) in the 1920 New Year Honours, and Knight Commander of the Order of the British Empire (KBE) in the 1922 King's Birthday Honours.

Later life

In 1928 Pōmare contracted tuberculosis. In the 1928 election Āpirana Ngata conducted Pōmare's campaign on his behalf, despite belonging to the opposition party. Pōmare was re-elected. Later Pōmare travelled to California in the hope that the climate would be good for his health. He died in Los Angeles on 27 June 1930.

Legacy
Māui Pōmare day (Te Ra o Māui Pōmare) is celebrated every year at Owae Marae in Waitara, Taranaki on the Saturday closest to the anniversary of his death. The day recognises his work in health reforms, politics and especially his investigation of Maori land confiscations.

Māui Pōmare day is also of significance to Samoa. In 1927 Pōmare spoke out in Parliament speeches against New Zealand's methods in dealing with Samoa's resistance movement, and this was recognised at the 2013 Māui Pōmare day.

In celebrating 150 years of The New Zealand Herald, the newspaper named him New Zealander of the year for 1926, for his work on Maori land grievances. The Herald gave him the same award again for 1927, for his work as Health Minister that led to fewer deaths of women at childbirth.

Notes

References

Further reading

 (This is a book intended for children.)

 (This two-volume work was reprinted by Southern Reprints (of Auckland) in 1987; and in a two volumes-in-one edition by Kiwi Publishers (of Christchurch) in 2000)

External links

Puke Ariki

1870s births
1930 deaths
New Zealand Companions of the Order of St Michael and St George
New Zealand Knights Commander of the Order of the British Empire
Members of the Cabinet of New Zealand
Members of the New Zealand House of Representatives
Reform Party (New Zealand) MPs
Independent MPs of New Zealand
People from Taranaki
20th-century deaths from tuberculosis
New Zealand MPs for Māori electorates
New Zealand people of World War I
People educated at Christchurch Boys' High School
People educated at Te Aute College
New Zealand Māori medical doctors
20th-century New Zealand medical doctors
Tuberculosis deaths in California
New Zealand politicians awarded knighthoods
Ngāti Mutunga people
Ngāti Toa people